The Halverson Log Cabin is located on the campus of the University of Wisconsin-Whitewater. It was added to the National Register of Historic Places in 1985.

It is a one-story  log cabin which was built in 1846 by Norwegian immigrant Gullik Halverson, who came to Wisconsin in 1845 when 23 years old.  He came with his parents from Valebo, Norway.

It is built of apparently hand-hewn logs, with dovetailed corners.

It was moved to its current location in 1907.

References

Houses in Walworth County, Wisconsin
Log cabins in the United States
Houses on the National Register of Historic Places in Wisconsin
University of Wisconsin–Whitewater
Houses completed in 1907
National Register of Historic Places in Walworth County, Wisconsin
Log buildings and structures on the National Register of Historic Places in Wisconsin
Whitewater, Wisconsin